Muguerza may refer to:

  (1936–2019), Spanish philosopher
 José A. Muguerza (1858–1939), Mexican entrepreneur and philanthropist
 José Muguerza (1911–1980), Spanish footballer
 Juan Muguerza (1900–1937), Spanish middle-distance runner